Fullard is a surname. Notable people with the surname include:

George Fullard (1923–1973), English sculptor
Jacques Fullard (born 1974), South African racing cyclist
John Fullard (1907–1973), Welsh tenor in Australia
Philip F. Fullard (1897–1984), English First World War flying ace

See also
Bullard